The Fisheries Society of Bangladesh (FSB) is a non-profit scientific society founded in 1977 by fishery professionals in Bangladesh. Any person possessing a degree or diploma in any branch of fisheries science or engaged in research and development activities connected with fisheries sector in Bangladesh are included in the society. It is dedicated to general advancement in fisheries education, research and extension programmes and their application to practical problems.

Its president in 2017 to 2018 was Muhammad Shahidul Haq of Bangladesh Agricultural University (BAU).

Aims and objectives
The Society's stated objectives are:
 To work for development of fisheries science and to apply acquired knowledge to solve practical problems. The word Fisheries includes any aquatic plants and animals having economic importance.
 To encourage research in various areas of fisheries and aquaculture
 To organize seminars, symposia, conferences, excursion and field study in the field of fisheries.
 To develop and maintain fund through donation and subscription to accomplish the aims and objectives of the Society.
 To make provisions for appreciation through fellowships and medal for enhancing research and extension activities. 
 To disseminate fisheries knowledge and technology to the stakeholders through:
Direct contact with the people
Recommendations to appropriate GOs and NGOs
Publications of Journals and periodicals.

The Society aims to encourage, promote and support all branches of fisheries science, aquaculture and conservation. In addition, the Society shall have the following powers to: 
convene and provide financial support for meetings on appropriate aspects of fish biology and fisheries science and conservation; 
disseminate research and technical information through the agency of the Society’s journal The Bangladesh Journal of Fisheries and by other means; 
collect and disseminate information on all matters affecting the above-mentioned activities and exchange such information with other bodies having similar objects whether in this country or overseas.

Operations
Every two years the Society holds a conference of scientists from home and abroad and discuss critical areas in which the members are deeply involved. In addition, each year the Society provides an opportunity for gathering of fisheries workers to learn new applications of technology and to exchange information with fellow professionals.

Through mass media, the Society generates among the people an awareness of the nature and causes of malnutrition and the role of the people can play to combat the same. Although not a lobbying organization, the Society does not hesitate to express its opinion on legislation and governmental policies and to make recommendations to the Government on fishery matters so as to help the Government formulate a national policy on the same commensurate with the hopes and aspirations of the nation.

Journal
FSB publishes one peer-reviewed journal including:
Bangladesh Journal of Fisheries
Executive Editor: Prof. Dr. Md. Samsul Alam

Scientific Event
FSB Biennial Conference (FSB2019): December 27–28, 2019

References
Bangladesh Fisheries Society Blogspot
FSB Biennial Conference (FSB2019)

External links

Scientific organisations based in Bangladesh
Non-profit organisations based in Bangladesh